Juan Carlos Olivas was a Mexican actor known for playing Héctor Luis Palma Salazar in the 2017 Netflix and Univision series El Chapo. Olivas died in April 2018 due to cancer.

References

External links

Year of birth missing
1980s births
2018 deaths
21st-century Mexican male actors
Mexican male television actors